John Deans Hope (8 May 1860 – 13 December 1949) was a Scottish Liberal politician.

Family and education
Hope was born in Duddington, Midlothian, the son of the late James Hope of Eastbarns, Dunbar, a famous agriculturalist. In 1899 he married Elizabeth Holmes-Kerr whose father had homes in Glasgow and Underbank in Ayrshire. They had one daughter. His brother, Sir Harry Hope, 1st Baronet, was the Unionist MP for Buteshire. Hope was educated at Fettes College and Edinburgh University.

Career
By profession Hope was a chartered accountant and later became a stockbroker. Hope was also a Justice of the Peace in Haddingtonshire.

Politics
Hope first stood for Parliament at West Perthshire at the 1895 general election but could not remove the sitting Liberal Unionist MP Sir Donald Currie. 

However he was successful in being returned as Liberal MP for West Fife in succession to Augustine Birrell in the Khaki election of 1900

Shortly after his election, Hope was described in Dod's Parliamentary Companion as a Radical who was opposed to Imperialism. This was shorthand for being opposed to the Boer War.

and he held the seat until the general election of December 1910 when he lost to the Labour candidate William Adamson the Secretary of the Fife Miners’ Association.

Return to Parliament
Hope did not have long to wait before getting the chance to return to Parliament as in 1911 the MP for Haddingtonshire, Richard Haldane, was made a Viscount and went to the House of Lords and Hope was chosen by the local Liberals to succeed him. In the by-election that followed Hope emerged the winner with 3,652 votes to the 3,184 of the Unionist candidate B Hall Blyth – a respectable majority of 468 (albeit a decrease on the last election of over 200). 

In his victory speech at Haddington Assembly Rooms, Hope said that East Lothian had been true to the cause of freedom, liberty and justice and had given a decisive verdict against the veto of the House of Lords (a reference to the ongoing struggle originating with the People's Budget of 1909 and the Parliament Act 1911. The result, claimed Hope, would strengthen the government against the forces of privilege and obstruction. It was a victory for self-government for Ireland, Home Rule for Scotland and reform of land law.

Haddingtonshire constituency was abolished in 1918 and Hope was adopted for one of its successor constituencies Berwick and Haddington. Hope was a supporter of the coalition government of Lloyd George Liberals and the Conservatives and he received the infamous government ‘Coupon’ at the 1918 general election, standing as a Coalition Liberal against Labour and Independent Liberal opposition.

Out of Parliament
At the 1922 general election both the local Conservative and Lloyd George Liberal Associations repudiated Hope as their candidate on the grounds that he had not made a single speech during his 24 years in Parliament. He had not been completely anonymous however having served on ten Parliamentary Commissions and having seconded a number of resolutions, apparently without ever being called upon to speak. Arthur Balfour wrote Hope a letter of support under the impression he was still Lloyd George's nominee but he later retracted it. In the election Hope supported Bonar Law as an Independent Lloyd Georgian but there was also an official Lloyd George candidate, Major Walter Waring and an Asquithian, Mr H Pringle as well as R Spence for Labour. 

It was the end of Hope's Parliamentary career as Waring won the contest.

References

External links 
 

1860 births
1949 deaths
Members of the Parliament of the United Kingdom for Scottish constituencies
UK MPs 1900–1906
UK MPs 1906–1910
UK MPs 1910–1918
UK MPs 1918–1922
Scottish Liberal Party MPs
Stockbrokers
People educated at Fettes College
Alumni of the University of Edinburgh
Members of the Parliament of the United Kingdom for Fife constituencies